Penn Township is located in Stark County, Illinois. As of the 2010 census, its population was 354 and it contained 136 housing units.

Geography

Demographics

References

External links
City-data.com
Illinois State Archives

Townships in Stark County, Illinois
Peoria metropolitan area, Illinois
Townships in Illinois